The 1999 Polish Film Awards was the 1st edition of Polish Film Awards: Eagles.

Awards winners

Special awards

 Life Achievement Award: Wojciech Has

External links
 1999 Polish Film Awards at IMDb

Polish Film Awards ceremonies
Polish Film Awards
1999 in Poland